Charles Margrave Taylor  (born November 5, 1931) is a Canadian philosopher from Montreal, Quebec, and professor emeritus at McGill University best known for his contributions to political philosophy, the philosophy of social science, the history of philosophy, and intellectual history. His work has earned him the Kyoto Prize, the Templeton Prize, the Berggruen Prize for Philosophy, and the John W. Kluge Prize.

In 2007, Taylor served with Gérard Bouchard on the Bouchard–Taylor Commission on reasonable accommodation with regard to cultural differences in the province of Quebec. He has also made contributions to moral philosophy, epistemology, hermeneutics, aesthetics, the philosophy of mind, the philosophy of language, and the philosophy of action.

Biography
Charles Margrave Taylor was born in Montreal, Quebec, on November 5, 1931, to a Roman Catholic Francophone mother and a Protestant Anglophone father by whom he was raised bilingually. His father, Walter Margrave Taylor, was a steel magnate originally from Toronto while his mother, Simone Marguerite Beaubien, was a dressmaker. His sister was Gretta Chambers. He attended Selwyn House School from 1939 to 1946, followed by Trinity College School from 1946 to 1949, and began his undergraduate education at McGill University where he received a Bachelor of Arts (BA) degree in history in 1952. He continued his studies at the University of Oxford, first as a Rhodes Scholar at Balliol College, receiving a BA degree with first-class honours in philosophy, politics and economics in 1955, and then as a postgraduate student, receiving a Doctor of Philosophy degree in 1961 under the supervision of Sir Isaiah Berlin. As an undergraduate student, he started one of the first campaigns to ban thermonuclear weapons in the United Kingdom in 1956, serving as the first president of the Oxford Campaign for Nuclear Disarmament.

He succeeded John Plamenatz as Chichele Professor of Social and Political Theory at the University of Oxford and became a fellow of All Souls College.

For many years, both before and after Oxford, he was Professor of Political Science and Philosophy at McGill University in Montreal, where he is now professor emeritus. Taylor was also a Board of Trustees Professor of Law and Philosophy at Northwestern University in Evanston, Illinois, for several years after his retirement from McGill.

Taylor was elected a foreign honorary member of the American Academy of Arts and Sciences in 1986. In 1991, Taylor was appointed to the Conseil de la langue française in the province of Quebec, at which point he critiqued Quebec's commercial sign laws. In 1995, he was made a Companion of the Order of Canada. In 2000, he was made a Grand Officer of the National Order of Quebec. In 2003, he was awarded the Social Sciences and Humanities Research Council's Gold Medal for Achievement in Research, which had been the council's highest honour. He was awarded the 2007 Templeton Prize for progress towards research or discoveries about spiritual realities, which included a cash award of US$1.5 million.

In 2007 he and Gérard Bouchard were appointed to head a one-year commission of inquiry into what would constitute reasonable accommodation for minority cultures in his home province of Quebec.

In June 2008, he was awarded the Kyoto Prize in the arts and philosophy category. The Kyoto Prize is sometimes referred to as the Japanese Nobel. In 2015, he was awarded the John W. Kluge Prize for Achievement in the Study of Humanity, a prize he shared with philosopher Jürgen Habermas. In 2016, he was awarded the inaugural $1-million Berggruen Prize for being "a thinker whose ideas are of broad significance for shaping human self-understanding and the advancement of humanity".

Views
Despite his extensive and diverse philosophical oeuvre, Taylor famously calls himself a "monomaniac," concerned with only one fundamental aspiration: to develop a convincing philosophical anthropology.

In order to understand Taylor's views, it is helpful to understand his philosophical background, especially his writings on Georg Wilhelm Friedrich Hegel, Ludwig Wittgenstein, Martin Heidegger, and Maurice Merleau-Ponty. Taylor rejects naturalism and formalist epistemology. He is part of an influential intellectual tradition of Canadian idealism that includes John Watson, George Paxton Young, C. B. Macpherson, and George Grant.

In his essay "To Follow a Rule," Taylor explores why people can fail to follow rules, and what kind of knowledge it is that allows a person to successfully follow a rule, such as the arrow on a sign. The intellectualist tradition presupposes that to follow directions, we must know a set of propositions and premises about how to follow directions.

Taylor argues that Wittgenstein's solution is that all interpretation of rules draws upon a tacit background. This background is not more rules or premises, but what Wittgenstein calls "forms of life." More specifically, Wittgenstein says in the Philosophical Investigations that "Obeying a rule is a practice." Taylor situates the interpretation of rules within the practices that are incorporated into our bodies in the form of habits, dispositions and tendencies.

Following Heidegger, Merleau-Ponty, Hans-Georg Gadamer, Michael Polanyi, and Wittgenstein, Taylor argues that it is mistaken to presuppose that our understanding of the world is primarily mediated by representations. It is only against an unarticulated background that representations can make sense to us. On occasion we do follow rules by explicitly representing them to ourselves, but Taylor reminds us that rules do not contain the principles of their own application: application requires that we draw on an unarticulated understanding or "sense of things" — the background.

Taylor's critique of naturalism
Taylor defines naturalism as a family of various, often quite diverse theories that all hold "the ambition to model the study of man on the natural sciences." Philosophically, naturalism was largely popularized and defended by the unity of science movement that was advanced by logical positivist philosophy. In many ways, Taylor's early philosophy springs from a critical reaction against the logical positivism and naturalism that was ascendant in Oxford while he was a student.

Initially, much of Taylor's philosophical work consisted of careful conceptual critiques of various naturalist research programs. This began with his 1964 dissertation The Explanation of Behaviour, which was a detailed and systematic criticism of the behaviourist psychology of B. F. Skinner that was highly influential at mid-century.

From there, Taylor also spread his critique to other disciplines. The essay "Interpretation and the Sciences of Man" was published in 1972 as a critique of the political science of the behavioural revolution advanced by giants of the field like David Easton, Robert Dahl, Gabriel Almond, and Sydney Verba. In an essay entitled "The Significance of Significance: The Case for Cognitive Psychology", Taylor criticized the naturalism he saw distorting the major research program that had replaced B. F. Skinner's behaviourism.

But Taylor also detected naturalism in fields where it was not immediately apparent. For example, in 1978's "Language and Human Nature" he found naturalist distortions in various modern "designative" theories of language, while in Sources of the Self (1989) he found both naturalist error and the deep moral, motivational sources for this outlook in various individualist and utilitarian conceptions of selfhood.

Taylor and hermeneutics

Concurrent to Taylor's critique of naturalism was his development of an alternative. Indeed, Taylor's mature philosophy begins when as a doctoral student at Oxford he turned away, disappointed, from analytic philosophy in search of other philosophical resources which he found in French and German modern hermeneutics and phenomenology.

The hermeneutic tradition develops a view of human understanding and cognition as centred on the decipherment of meanings (as opposed to, say, foundational theories of brute verification or an apodictic rationalism). Taylor's own philosophical outlook can broadly and fairly be characterized as hermeneutic and has been called engaged hermeneutics. This is clear in his championing of the works of major figures within the hermeneutic tradition such as Wilhelm Dilthey, Heidegger, Merleau-Ponty, and Gadamer. It is also evident in his own original contributions to hermeneutic and interpretive theory.

Communitarian critique of liberalism
Taylor (as well as Alasdair MacIntyre, Michael Walzer, and Michael Sandel) is associated with a communitarian critique of liberal theory's understanding of the "self". Communitarians emphasize the importance of social institutions in the development of individual meaning and identity.

In his 1991 Massey Lecture The Malaise of Modernity, Taylor argued that political theorists—from John Locke and Thomas Hobbes to John Rawls and Ronald Dworkin—have neglected the way in which individuals arise within the context supplied by societies. A more realistic understanding of the "self" recognizes the social background against which life choices gain importance and meaning.

Philosophy and sociology of religion

Taylor's later work has turned to the philosophy of religion, as evident in several pieces, including the lecture "A Catholic Modernity" and the short monograph "Varieties of Religion Today: William James Revisited".

Taylor's most significant contribution in this field to date is his book A Secular Age which argues against the secularization thesis of Max Weber, Steve Bruce, and others. In rough form, the secularization thesis holds that as modernity (a bundle of phenomena including science, technology, and rational forms of authority) progresses, religion gradually diminishes in influence. Taylor begins from the fact that the modern world has not seen the disappearance of religion but rather its diversification and in many places its growth.  He then develops a complex alternative notion of what secularization actually means given that the secularization thesis has not been borne out. In the process, Taylor also greatly deepens his account of moral, political, and spiritual modernity that he had begun in Sources of the Self.

Politics
Taylor was a candidate for the social democratic New Democratic Party (NDP) in Mount Royal on three occasions in the 1960s, beginning with the 1962 federal election when he came in third behind Liberal Alan MacNaughton. He improved his standing in 1963, coming in second. Most famously, he also lost in the 1965 election to newcomer and future prime minister, Pierre Trudeau. This campaign garnered national attention. Taylor's fourth and final attempt to enter the House of Commons of Canada was in the 1968 federal election, when he came in second as an NDP candidate in the riding of Dollard. In 1994 he coedited a paper on human rights with Vitit Muntarbhorn in Thailand. In 2008, he endorsed the NDP candidate in Westmount—Ville-Marie, Anne Lagacé Dowson. He was also a professor to Canadian politician and former leader of the New Democratic Party Jack Layton.

Taylor served as a vice president of the federal NDP (beginning ) and was president of its Quebec section.

In 2010, Taylor said multiculturalism was a work in progress that faced challenges. He identified tackling Islamophobia in Canada as the next challenge.

In his 2020 book Reconstructing Democracy he, together with Patrizia Nanz and Madeleine Beaubien Taylor, uses local examples to describe how democracies in transformation might be revitalized by involving citizenship.

Interlocutors

Himani Bannerji: "Charles Taylor's Politics of Recognition: A Critique" (2000)
Richard Rorty
Bernard Williams
Alasdair MacIntyre: critique of liberalism
Will Kymlicka
Martha Nussbaum
Kwame Appiah
Hubert Dreyfus: co-author
Quentin Skinner
Talal Asad
Marcel Gauchet
Arjun Appadurai: on the imaginary
Paul Berman
William E. Connolly
Robert Bellah: on Taylor's A Secular Age
John Milbank
Stuart Hall
Catherine Pickstock
James Tully: on Taylor on "Deep Diversity"
Jürgen Habermas: shared Kluge prize

Published works

Books
 
 
 
 
 

 
 

 

 

 
 

 Multiculturalism and "The Politics of Recognition". Edited by Gutmann, Amy. Princeton, New Jersey: Princeton University Press. 1992.
  [Reconciling the Solitudes: Writings on Canadian Federalism and Nationalism] (in French). Edited by Laforest, Guy. Sainte-Foy, Quebec: Les Presses de l'Université Laval. 1992.
 English translation: Reconciling the Solitudes: Essays on Canadian Federalism and Nationalism. Edited by Laforest, Guy. Montreal: McGill-Queen's University Press. 1993.
 Road to Democracy: Human Rights and Human Development in Thailand. With Muntarbhorn, Vitit. Montreal: International Centre for Human Rights and Democratic Development. 1994.
 

  (in Swedish). Edited by Grimen, Harald. Gothenburg, Sweden: Daidalos. 1995.
 

  (in French). Translated by de Lara, Philippe. Paris: Presses Universitaires de France. 1997.
 A Catholic Modernity? Edited by Heft, James L. New York: Oxford University Press. 1999.
  [Invoking Civil Society] (in Serbo-Croatian). Edited by Savic, Obrad.
 
 
 

 

  (in French). With Maclure, Jocelyn. Montreal: Boréal. 2010.
 English translation: Secularism and Freedom of Conscience. With Maclure, Jocelyn. Translated by Todd, Jane Marie. Cambridge, Massachusetts: Harvard University Press. 2011.
 

 Church and People: Disjunctions in a Secular Age. Edited with Casanova, José; McLean, George F. Washington: Council for Research in Values and Philosophy. 2012.
  / Republican Democracy. Edited by Cristi, Renato; Tranjan, J. Ricardo. Santiago: LOM Ediciones. 2012.
 Boundaries of Toleration. Edited with Stepan, Alfred C. New York: Columbia University Press. 2014.
  (in Italian). Edited and translated by Costa, Paolo. Bologna, Italy: EDB. 2014.
  (in Italian). Edited and translated by Costa, Paolo. Parma, Italy: Diabasis. 2014.
 

 English translation: 
 Retrieving Realism. With Dreyfus, Hubert. Cambridge, Massachusetts: Harvard University Press. 2015.
 
 Reconstructing Democracy. How Citizens Are Building from the Ground Up. With Nanz, Patrizia; Beaubien Taylor, Madeleine. Cambridge, Massachusetts: Harvard University Press. 2020

Selected book chapters

See also
 List of Canadian philosophers
 List of people from Montreal

Notes

References

Footnotes

Works cited

Further reading

 
 
 Braak, Andre van der.  Reimagining Zen in a Secular age: Charles Taylor and Zen Buddhism in the West (Brill Rodopi,  2020) online review

External links

 A comprehensive bibliography that includes all of Taylor's works as well as secondary literature on Taylor's philosophy, interviews, media, and resources.
 A wide-ranging interview with Charles Taylor, including Taylor's thoughts about his own intellectual development.
 An Interview with Charles Taylor Part 1, Part 2 and Part 3
 The Immanent Frame a blog with posts by Taylor, Robert Bellah, and others concerning Taylor's book A Secular Age
 Text of Taylor's essay "Overcoming Epistemology"''
 Links to secondary sources, reviews of Taylor's works, reading notes
 Lecture notes to Charles Taylor's talk on Religion and Violence (with a link to the audio) Nov 2004
 Lecture notes to Charles Taylor's talk on 'An End to Mediational Epistemology', Nov 2004
 Study guide to Philosophical Arguments and Philosophical Papers 2
 Templeton Prize announcement
 Short essay by Dene Baker, philosophers.co.uk
 Taylor's famous essay The Politics of Recognition 
 Charles Taylor on McGill Yearbook when he graduated in 1952

Online videos of Charles Taylor
Berggruen Prize Winner Charles Taylor on the Big Questions; series of videos produced by the Berggruen Institute 
 Can Human Action Be Explained?; Charles Taylor gives a lecture at Columbia University
 ; Charles Taylor gives a lecture on a future politics self-consciously based on differing views and foundations in Milan
 ; Charles Taylor at awarding of Templeton Prize
  «La religion dans la Cité des modernes : un divorce sans issue?» (14/10/2006) ; Charles Taylor and Pierre Manent, Musée des Beaux-Arts de Montréal,  «Les grandes conférences Argument».

1931 births
20th-century Canadian philosophers
21st-century Canadian philosophers
Action theorists
Analytic philosophers
Anglophone Quebec people
Canadian Roman Catholics
Canadian people of English descent
Canadian political philosophers
Canadian Rhodes Scholars
Catholic philosophers
Chichele Professors of Social and Political Theory
Communitarianism
Companions of the Order of Canada
Fellows of All Souls College, Oxford
Fellows of the American Academy of Arts and Sciences
Fellows of the British Academy
Fellows of the Royal Society of Canada
Francophone Quebec people
Grand Officers of the National Order of Quebec
Heidegger scholars
Kyoto laureates in Arts and Philosophy
Living people
McGill University alumni
New Democratic Party candidates for the Canadian House of Commons
Northwestern University faculty
Ontologists
People from Montreal
Philosophers of social science
Quebec candidates for Member of Parliament
Quebecers of French descent
Scholars of nationalism
Templeton Prize laureates
Trinity College School alumni
Canadian Christians
Ratzinger Prize laureates